The 1950 French Championships (now known as the French Open) was a tennis tournament that took place on the outdoor clay courts at the Stade Roland-Garros in Paris, France. The tournament ran from 24 May until 4 June. It was the 54th staging of the French Championships, and the second Grand Slam tennis event of 1950. Budge Patty and Doris Hart won the singles titles.

Finals

Men's singles

 Budge Patty defeated  Jaroslav Drobný 6–1, 6–2, 3–6, 5–7, 7–5

Women's singles

 Doris Hart defeated  Patricia Canning Todd 6–4, 4–6, 6–2

Men's doubles
 Bill Talbert /  Tony Trabert  defeated  Jaroslav Drobný /  Eric Sturgess  6–2, 1–6, 10–8, 6–2

Women's doubles
 Doris Hart /  Shirley Fry defeated  Louise Brough /  Margaret Osborne duPont 1–6, 7–5, 6–2

Mixed doubles
 Barbara Scofield /  Enrique Morea defeated  Patricia Canning Todd  /  Bill Talbert  walkover

References

External links
 French Open official website

French Championships
French Championships (tennis) by year
French Championships (tennis)
French Championships (tennis)
French Championships (tennis)
French Championships (tennis)